Friedmann Valley is one of the McMurdo Dry Valleys, located west of Rector Ridge at the head of Beacon Valley, in the Quartermain Mountains, Victoria Land, Antarctica. It was named in 1992 by the Advisory Committee on Antarctic Names after E. Imre Friedmann, a biologist at the Polar Desert Research Center, Florida State University, who in virtually every austral summer, 1976–87, led United States Antarctic Research Program field parties in the study of microorganisms in rocks of the McMurdo Dry Valleys. His wife, Roseli Ocampo-Friedmann, was a member of the field party in the last four seasons.

References

Valleys of Victoria Land
McMurdo Dry Valleys